Wood's screw maneuver is practiced in obstetrics when dealing with shoulder dystocia – a condition in which the fetal shoulders cannot easily pass through the vagina. In this maneuver the anterior shoulder is pushed towards the baby's chest, and the posterior shoulder is pushed towards the baby's back, making the baby's head somewhat face the mother's rectum.

This maneuver is tried only after the McRoberts maneuver, and application of suprapubic (lower abdomen) pressure have been tried.

It is named after Wood, who was the first to examine this maneuver in detail.

See also 
 McRoberts maneuver
 Zavanelli maneuver
 Shoulder dystocia
 The mechanics of birth

References 

Obstetrical procedures